The Negrileasa is a right tributary of the river Suha in Romania. It flows into the Suha near Stulpicani.

References

Rivers of Romania
Rivers of Suceava County